Edmiston is a surname. Notable people with the surname include: 

Althea Brown Edmiston (1874–1937), African-American teacher and missionary
Andrew Edmiston Jr. (1892–1966), American politician
Robert Edmiston (born 1946), British motor trade entrepreneur and philanthropist
Sarah Edmiston (born 1975), Australian Paralympic athlete
Walker Edmiston (1925–2007), American actor
William S. Edmiston (1857–1903), Canadian politician